The Eternity Range is a range of mountains  long, rising to , and trending north–south approximately in the middle of the Antarctic Peninsula, in the Palmer Land region of Antarctica.

Geography
The Eternity Range is divided into three main mountain blocks, the major summits in each from north to south being Mount Faith, Mount Hope, and Mount Charity. These four names were applied by Lincoln Ellsworth who discovered the range from the air during his flights of November 21 and November 23, 1935.

Expeditions
In November 1936, the range was surveyed by John Riddoch Rymill of the British Graham Land Expedition who gave the name "Mount Wakefield" to the central mountain in the range. This complication by Rymill, and uncertainty as to the precise location or extent of Ellsworth's discovery, hindered for a time a resolution of its nomenclature (i.e., following the U.S. Antarctic Service expedition in 1939–41, the name Eternity Range or Eternity Mountains was incorrectly applied to the present Welch Mountains  farther south). A careful study of the original reports, maps and photographs, and comparison with materials from subsequent expeditions such as the Ronne Antarctic Research Expedition, 1947, and the Falkland Islands Dependencies Survey, 1960, has led to the conclusion that the range described comprises at least the core of Ellsworth's Eternity Range and appropriately commemorates his discovery. The name "Wakefield", given by Rymill, has been transferred to nearby Wakefield Highland.

See also
 Antarctandes Range — adjacent northern range on the Antarctic Peninsula. 
 Brand Peak —  lies 10 nautical miles (19 km) east-southeast of the Eternity Range.
 Mount Sullivan

References 

Mountain ranges of Palmer Land
Antarctic Peninsula